City Recital Hall in Sydney, Australia, is a purpose-built concert venue with the capacity for an audience of 1,238 people seated over three tiers of sloped seating. It is situated in the city centre in Angel Place, just off Martin Place.

City Recital Hall, opened in 1999, is the first specially designed concert venue to be built in the city since the Opera House in 1973. The role of City Recital Hall is to provide a high quality venue of international standing.

The venue was initiated by the City of Sydney and was specifically designed for solo recitals, chamber music and the spoken word. The auditorium's 1.8-second reverberation time is attuned for chamber music. The spoken word and amplified music are accommodated by the operation of specially designed acoustic banners. The entire auditorium is supported on rubber bearings to avoid vibration and street sounds and the air conditioning and lighting systems have been treated to minimise external noise.

The Hall was designed in a shoebox shape, based on the classical configuration of 19th-century European concert halls. The design includes gently sloping stalls and two galleries that wrap around both sides and rear of the auditorium. The décor is of grey, gold leaf, light timber panelling and plum-coloured upholstery. The main grand stairway is of white marble.

City Recital Hall has hosted the following companies:
 Australian Brandenburg Orchestra
 Australian Chamber Orchestra
 Australian String Quartet
 Gondwana Voices
 Musica Viva Australia
 Pinchgut Opera 
 Selby & Friends 
 Sydney Children's Choir
 Sydney Festival
 Sydney Philharmonia Choirs
 Sydney Symphony
 Sydney Writers Festival

See also
 List of concert halls
 Forgotten Songs (artwork)

Further reading
 Dr Lisa Anne Murray, "Musical Chairs: The Quest for a City Recital Hall", Sydney 2006. 
(The book was launched by Sydney's Lord Mayor, Clover Moore, at the City Recital Hall at 6pm on Wednesday 31 May 2006).

External links

Official City Recital Hall website
Review of the new book "Musical Chairs: The Quest for a City Recital Hall"

Concert halls in Australia
Theatres in Sydney
Music venues completed in 1999
Music venues in Sydney
1999 establishments in Australia